Hippeastrum reginae is a flowering perennial herbaceous bulbous plant, in the family Amaryllidaceae, native to Venezuela, Bolivia, Peru and Brazil.

Description

Taxonomy 
Described by Carl Linnaeus in 1759, as Amaryllis reginae, it was the type species for the genus. It was transferred to Hippeastrum by William Herbert.

References

Sources 
 
 GBIF: Hippeastrum reginae
 Pacific Bulb Society: Hippeastrum reginae
 
 International Bulb Society: Hippeastrum reginae (image)

Flora of South America
reginae
Garden plants of South America
Plants described in 1759